STKRJ Kampong Lambak Kiri is a public housing estate and located village in the north of Brunei-Muara District, Brunei. The population was 2,593 in 2016. It is one of the villages within Mukim Berakas 'A'. The postcode is BB1114.

See also 
 Public housing in Brunei

References 

Public housing estates in Brunei
Villages in Brunei-Muara District